The White Army or White armies are common collective names for the armed formations of the White movement and anti-Soviet governments during the Civil War in Russia (1917–1923)

The term may also refer to:
Saudi Arabian National Guard
Nuer White Army, a semi-organised militancy of Nuer youths in South Sudan in east-central Africa after its secession and independence in 2011 from Sudan in the north
White Guard (Finland), which constituted the bulk of the White Army, Finnish government forces in the Finnish Civil War (January–May 1918)